This is a list of lists of countries and territories by various criteria. A country or territory is a geographical area, either in the sense of nation (a cultural entity) or state (a political entity).

Demographics

Population, gender and poverty 
 List of countries and dependencies by population
 List of countries by population (United Nations)
 List of countries and dependencies by population density
 List of countries by past and future population density
 List of countries by real population density
 Lists of countries by population in:
 1; 1000; 1500; 1600; 1700; 1800; 1900; 1907; 1939; 1989; 2000; 2005; 2010; 2015
 List of countries by past and projected future population
 List of countries by population growth rate
 List of countries by natural increase
 List of countries by net migration rate
 List of countries by sex ratio
 List of countries by abortion statistics
 List of countries by homeless population
 List of countries by percentage of population living in poverty
 Urbanization by country

Life and health 
 List of countries by age structure
 List of sovereign states and dependent territories by birth rate
 List of sovereign states and dependent territories by mortality rate
 List of countries by dependency ratio
 List of sovereign states and dependencies by total fertility rate
 List of countries by past fertility rate
 List of sovereign states and dependent territories by immigrant population
 List of countries by HIV/AIDS adult prevalence rate
 List of countries by intentional death rate
 List of countries by intentional homicide rate
 List of countries by infant and under-five mortality rates
 List of countries by life expectancy
 List of countries by past life expectancy
 List of countries by maternal mortality ratio
 List of countries by median age
 List of countries by number of births
 List of countries by suicide rate
 List of countries by body mass index
 Education Index
 List of countries by Human Development Index
 List of countries by inequality-adjusted Human Development Index
 Life Expectancy Index
 List of countries by literacy rate (Adult Literacy Index)
 List of countries by obesity rate
 List of countries by percentage of population who are undernourished
 World Happiness Report

Religion 
 Ahmadiyya by country
 Buddhism by country
 Christianity by country
 Hinduism by country
 Islam by country
 Jehovah's Witnesses by country
 Jewish population by country
 Sikhism by country
 List of countries by irreligion
 Importance of religion by country

Language 
 List of official languages by country and territory
 List of countries by spoken languages
 List of countries by English-speaking population
 List of countries and territories where Afrikaans or Dutch are official languages
 List of countries and territories where Arabic is an official language
 List of countries and territories where Chinese is an official language
 List of countries and territories where English is an official language
 List of countries and territories where French is an official language
 List of countries and territories where German is an official language
 List of countries and territories where Hindustani is an official language
 List of countries and territories where Malay is an official language
 List of countries and territories where Persian is an official language
 List of countries and territories where Portuguese is an official language
 List of countries and territories where Romanian is an official language
 List of countries and territories where Russian is an official language
 List of countries and territories where Spanish is an official language
 List of countries and territories where Tamil is an official language

Economy 

 
The production, distribution and consumption of goods and services:

 List of countries by central bank interest rates
 List of countries by corporate debt
 List of countries by current account balance
 Ease of doing business index rankings
 List of countries by economic freedom
 List of countries by employment rate
 List of countries by exports
 List of countries by exports per capita
 List of countries by external debt
 List of countries by foreign-exchange reserves
 List of countries by freshwater withdrawal
 List of countries by gross fixed investment as percentage of GDP
 List of countries by gross national savings
 List of countries by household debt
 List of countries by household final consumption expenditure per capita
 List of countries by imports
 List of countries by income equality
 List of countries by male to female income ratio
 List of countries by market capitalization of listed domestic companies
 List of countries by minimum wage
 List of countries by number of billionaires
 List of countries by number of broadband Internet subscriptions
 List of countries by number of Internet hosts
 List of countries by number of Internet users
 List of countries by Internet connection speeds
 List of countries by number of millionaires
 List of countries by number of scientific and technical journal articles
 List of countries by Official Development Assistance received
 List of countries by public debt
 List of countries by research and development spending
 List of countries by share of population with access to financial services
 List of countries by tariff rate
 List of countries by tax revenue to GDP ratio
 List of countries by trade-to-GDP ratio
 List of countries by unemployment rate
 List of countries by wealth inequality
 List of countries by wealth per adult
 List of largest consumer markets
 List of development aid country donors

Gross domestic product 

The value of goods and services produced within a country:

 List of countries by GDP (nominal)
 List of countries by GDP (nominal) per capita
 List of countries by past and projected GDP (nominal)
 List of countries by past and projected GDP (nominal) per capita
 List of countries by GDP (PPP)
 List of countries by GDP (PPP) per capita
 List of regions by past GDP (PPP)
 List of regions by past GDP (PPP) per capita
 List of countries by past and projected GDP (PPP)
 List of countries by past and projected GDP (PPP) per capita
 List of countries by GDP (PPP) per person employed
 List of countries by real GDP growth rate
 List of countries by GDP (real) per capita growth rate
 List of countries by GDP growth 1980–2010
 List of countries by industrial production growth rate
 List of countries by GNI (PPP) per capita
 List of countries by GNI (nominal) per capita
 List of countries by GDP sector composition
 List of countries by household final consumption expenditure per capita
 List of countries by largest historical GDP

Industrial output 

 List of countries by aluminium exports
 List of countries by cement production
 List of countries by coal production
 List of countries by copper exports
 List of countries by copper production
 List of countries by copper smelter production
 List of countries by diamond exports
 List of countries by diamond production
 List of countries by natural gas consumption
 List of countries by natural gas imports
 List of countries by natural gas proven reserves
 List of countries by gas turbine exports
 List of countries by gold exports
 List of countries by gold production
 List of countries by steel production
 List of countries by oil exports
 List of countries by net oil exports
 List of countries by oil imports
 List of countries by oil production
 List of countries by proven oil reserves
 List of countries by refined petroleum exports

Agriculture 

 Fishing industry by country
 International wheat production statistics
 Land use statistics by country
 List of countries by apple production
 List of countries by apricot production
 List of countries by artichoke production
 List of countries by avocado production
 List of countries by barley production
 List of countries by cereal production
 List of countries by cherry production
 List of countries by coconut production
 List of countries by coffee production
 List of countries by cucumber production
 List of countries by eggplant production
 List of countries by food energy intake
 List of countries by forest area
 List of countries by garlic production
 List of countries by irrigated land area
 List of countries by papaya production
 List of countries by pineapple production
 List of countries by plum production
 List of countries by potato production
 List of countries by rice production
 List of countries by soybean production
 List of countries by tomato production
 List of countries by coffee exports
 List of countries by maize exports
 List of countries by wheat exports
 List of largest producing countries of agricultural commodities
 List of wine-producing countries

Other exports 
 List of countries by computer exports
 List of countries by engine exports
 List of countries by live animal exports
 List of countries by pharmaceutical exports
 List of countries by raw cotton exports
 List of countries by telecommunications equipment exports
 List of countries by telephone exports

Environment 

The physical, chemical, and biotic factors that act upon an ecosystem:
 List of countries by carbon dioxide emissions
 List of countries by carbon dioxide emissions per capita
 List of countries by electric car use
 Government incentives for plug-in electric vehicles
 Phase-out of fossil fuel vehicles#Countries
 List of countries by electrification rate
 List of countries by electricity consumption
 List of countries by electricity imports
 List of countries by electricity exports
 List of countries by electricity production
 List of countries by energy consumption per capita
 List of countries by greenhouse gas emissions per capita
 List of countries with the most hydro-electric capacity
 List of countries by installed wind power capacity
 List of countries by renewable electricity production
 List of countries by total primary energy consumption and production

Geography 

Earth and its features:

 List of countries and dependencies by area
 List of countries by forest area
 List of countries by length of coastline
 List of countries by total renewable water resources
 List of countries without rivers
 List of sovereign states and dependent territories by continent
 List of sovereign states and dependent territories by continent (data file)
 List of elevation extremes by country
 List of countries by northernmost point
 List of countries by southernmost point
 List of countries by easternmost point
 List of countries by westernmost point
 List of countries by Exclusive Economic Zone
 List of island countries
 List of countries by largest island
 List of countries by number of islands
 List of countries that border only one other country
 List of countries and territories by land borders
 List of landlocked countries

Human rights 

 Freedom of religion by country
 Freedom of speech by country
 Blasphemy law by country
 Censorship by country
 Internet censorship and surveillance by country
 Human rights by country
 Legality of Holocaust denial by country
 LGBT rights by country or territory

International standards 
 List of countries by United Nations geoscheme
 List of ISO 3166 country codes

Military 

 List of countries by military expenditures
 List of countries by number of military and paramilitary personnel
 List of aircraft carriers
 List of states with nuclear weapons
 List of submarine operators

Names 

The label for the country:

 List of sovereign states
 List of alternative country names
 List of countries and dependencies and their capitals in native languages
 List of countries named after people
 List of country-name etymologies
 List of country names in various languages

Politics 

The process by which groups, often governments, make decisions:

 Capital punishment by country
 Democracy Index
 Freedom in the World
 Global Corruption Barometer
 Lists of active separatist movements
 List of administrative divisions by country
 List of autonomous areas by country
 List of countries by date of transition to republican system of government
 List of countries by system of government
 List of countries' copyright lengths
 List of countries without political parties
 List of countries by number of diplomatic missions
 List of current heads of state and government
 List of electoral systems by country
 List of enclaves and exclaves
 List of fascist movements by country
 List of former sovereign states
 List of fictional countries
 List of legislatures by country
 List of micronations
 List of national constitutions
 List of next general elections
 List of parties to international copyright agreements
 List of ruling political parties by country (party systems and ruling parties)
 List of sovereign states by date of formation
 Lists of political entities by century
 List of territorial disputes

Sports 

 List of FIFA country codes 
 List of IOC country codes
 All-time Olympic Games medal table

National symbols 
 Gallery of sovereign state flags
 List of sovereign states by date of current flag adoption
 List of aspect ratios of national flags
 List of flags by color
 List of flags by color combination
 Armorial of sovereign states
 Timeline of national flags

Transport 

 List of countries by aircraft and spacecraft exports
 List of countries by aircraft component exports
 List of countries by automotive component exports
 List of countries by car exports
 List of countries by ship exports
 List of countries by truck exports
 List of countries by road network size
 List of countries by traffic-related death rate
 List of countries by vehicles per capita
 List of countries by motor vehicle production
 List of countries by left- and right-hand traffic
 List of international vehicle registration codes
 List of country codes on British diplomatic vehicle registration plates
 List of countries by rail transport network size
 List of countries by rail usage
 List of countries by number of heliports
 List of merchant navy capacity by country
 List of countries by total length of pipelines
 List of countries by waterways length
 Lists of airports by country
 List of countries without an airport
 Lists of ports by country
 List of shipbuilders and shipyards

Food and drink 
 List of countries by beer consumption per capita
 List of countries by wine production
 List of countries by meat consumption
 List of countries by alcohol consumption per capita
 List of countries by tea consumption per capita
 List of countries by milk consumption per capita
 List of countries with Burger King franchises
 List of countries with McDonald's restaurants
 List of countries with KFC franchises
 List of countries with Jollibee outlets

Miscellaneous 
 List of countries and inhabited areas
 List of countries by incarceration rate
 List of countries by mains electricity voltages, frequencies, and plug type
 List of country calling codes
 List of Internet top-level domains
 List of national capitals
 List of countries whose capital is not their largest city
 List of countries with multiple capitals
 Lists of time zones
 List of time zones by country
 Daylight saving time by country
 World Heritage Sites by country
 Tobacco consumption by country
 List of countries by prevalence of cocaine use

References

External links 
List of Global Development Indexes and Rankings

 
Geography-related lists